The 1929–30 Cincinnati Bearcats men's basketball team represented the University of Cincinnati during the 1929–30 NCAA men's basketball season. The head coach was Frank Rice, coaching his second season with the Bearcats. The Bearcats three-peat as Buckeye Athletic Association champions. The team finished with an overall record of 14–4.

Schedule

|-

References

Cincinnati Bearcats men's basketball seasons
Cincinnati
Cincinnati Bearcats men's basketball team
Cincinnati Bearcats men's basketball team